Urari is a rural locality (a selo) and the administrative centre of Urarinsky Selsoviet, Dakhadayevsky District, Republic of Dagestan, Russia. The population was 846 as of 2010. There are 10 streets.

Geography
Urari is located 37 km southwest of Urkarakh (the district's administrative centre) by road. Turakarimakhi and Kurkimakhi are the nearest rural localities.

References 

Rural localities in Dakhadayevsky District